Marimar is a 2015 Philippine television drama romance series broadcast by GMA Network. The series is based on a 1994 Mexican television series of the same title. It premiered on the network's Telebabad line up from August 24, 2015 to January 8, 2016, replacing Pari 'Koy.

Mega Manila ratings are provided by AGB Nielsen Philippines.

Series overview
<onlyinclude>

Episodes

Season 1 (2015)

August 2015

September 2015

October 2015

November 2015

Season 2 (2015-2016)

November 2015

December 2015

January 2016

References

Lists of Philippine drama television series episodes